Mohammedan Sporting Club is a Bangladeshi cricket team that plays List A cricket in the Dhaka Premier League. It is affiliated with the Mohammedan Sporting Club football team. The Mohammedan Sporting Club also has teams that compete in volleyball, hockey and badminton.

History
Mohammedan Sporting Club won the Dhaka Premier League title nine times in the years before it became a List A competition, second only to Abahani Limited, who won 17 times.

List A record
 2013–14: 15 matches, won 9, finished fourth
 2014–15: 16 matches, won 8, finished sixth
 2015–16: 16 matches, won 8, finished fifth
 2016–17: 16 matches, won 8, finished fifth
 2017–18: 11 matches, won 5,  tied 1, finished seventh
 2018–19: 16 matches, won 7, finished sixth
 2021–22: 10 matches, won 5, finished seventh

Captaincy
Mashrafe Mortaza captained the team in 2013–14 and 2014–15, Mushfiqur Rahim in 2015–16, Tamim Iqbal and Raqibul Hasan in 2016–17, Shamsur Rahman in 2017–18, and Raqibul Hasan and Nadif Chowdhury in 2018–19.

Current squad
Players with international caps are listed in bold

Records
The highest score is 190, the competition record at the time, by Raqibul Hasan against Abahani in 2016–17 and the best bowling figures are 6 for 24 by Taijul Islam in 2016–17.

References

External links
 List A matches played by Mohammedan Sporting Club

Dhaka Premier Division Cricket League teams